The panrays are a genus, Zanobatus, of rays found in coastal parts of the warm East Atlantic Ocean, ranging from Morocco to Angola. It is the only genus in the family Zanobatidae, which traditionally has been included in the Myliobatiformes order, but based on genetic evidence it is now in Rhinopristiformes or a sister taxon to Rhinopristiformes.

The two species of panrays are generally poorly known and one of the species was only scientifically described in 2016. They are ovoviviparous and feed on benthic invertebrates.

Species
There are two recognized species in the genus:

 Maculate panray (Zanobatus maculatus) 
 Striped panray (Zanobatus schoenleinii)

References

Ray genera
Taxa named by Samuel Garman